Martin Jarmond (born November 22, 1979) is an American college athletics administrator who is the athletic director at the University of California, Los Angeles (UCLA). He played college basketball at the University of North Carolina Wilmington, where he was a two-time captain for the UNC Wilmington Seahawks. He holds an M.B.A and a master's degree in sports administration from Ohio University. Jarmond was the associate athletic director at Michigan State University (2003–2009) before serving as the deputy director of athletics at Ohio State University (2009–2017). In 2017 at age 37, he became the youngest athletic director among the Power Five conferences and the first African-American athletic director in Boston College history.

References

External links
 UCLA profile

1980 births
Living people
African-American college athletic directors in the United States
Michigan State Spartans athletic directors
Ohio State Buckeyes athletic directors
Boston College Eagles athletic directors
UCLA Bruins athletic directors
Ohio University alumni
Sportspeople from Fayetteville, North Carolina
Basketball players from North Carolina
African-American basketball players
American men's basketball players
Guards (basketball)
UNC Wilmington Seahawks men's basketball players
21st-century African-American sportspeople
20th-century African-American people
21st-century African-American people